A list of crime films released in the before 1930.

References

1929
Crime
Crime
Crime
Crime